Thomas Banks (born 10 November 1929) is an English retired footballer who played as a left back.

He was born at Farnworth, Lancashire. He played for Bolton Wanderers from 1947 to 1961 and was a member of the 1958 FA Cup winning team when Bolton beat Manchester United. He also  played six matches for the England national team in 1958, including all four matches in the 1958 FIFA World Cup. He got his opportunity in the England team because of the death of incumbent left-back Roger Byrne in the Munich Air Disaster in February 1958. Despite strong performances in the World Cup, he made only a single appearance for England after the tournament, as he was hampered by a persistent hamstring injury which ultimately curtailed his career. As recounted in Declan Hill's book The Fix, Banks also had a small but influential role in the fight to acquire better pay and conditions for football players in the 1961 labour dispute with the Football League. He also played non-League football for Altrincham.

References

1929 births
Living people
English footballers
England international footballers
Bolton Wanderers F.C. players
Altrincham F.C. players
Bangor City F.C. players
English Football League players
Association football fullbacks
People from Farnworth
1958 FIFA World Cup players
English Football League representative players
FA Cup Final players